Sheltech (Pvt.) Ltd. is a real estate company based in Dhaka, Bangladesh, which was founded in 1988. It is a multi-disciplinary firm engaged in various activities, including real estate development, consultancy. It has three chains of boutique hotels named Platinum Suites, Platinum Residence and Platinum Grand. It has constructed over 3700 apartments in Dhaka.

History
Sheltech was founded in 1988 by Tapan Chowdhury, Samuel Chowdhury, Kutubuddin Ahmed, and Taufiq M Seraj who started the company. The Chodhury brothers sold their shares in 2008 as they wanted to focus on their family business, Square Group.

In May 2015, the chairman and managing director of Sheltech were designated as commercially important persons by the government of Bangladesh.

In January, Sheltech completed construction of Sheltech Bithika, the largest real estate project of the company with 184 apartments and 12 commercial spaces in Mirpur Thana, Dhaka. The managing director of Toufiq M Seraj died on a flight of Qatar Airlines flying from Dhaka to Doha on 21 June 2019. Tanvir Ahmed was appointed the new managing director of Sheltech in August. Sk Bashir Ahmed was appointed Vice-Chairman of the Group in October.

Chairman of Sheltech Group, Kutubuddin Ahmed, is also the chairman of Envoy Group.

In March 2022, Sheltech Brokerage Limited signed an agreement with United Arab Emirates based ZagTrader PLC to improve it's IT infrastructure.

Subsidiaries 

 Sheltech Holdings Limited
 Sheltech Engineering Limited
 Sheltech Protection Services Limited
 Sheltech Brokerage Limited
 Sheltech Technology Limited
 Sheltech Ceramics Limited
 Sheltech Consultants (Private) Limited
 Bengal Meat
 Sreemangal Tea Estate Limited
 Sheltech Property Management Limited
 Sheltech Express Limited
 Grind Tech Limited
 Sheltech Homes Limited
 Envoy-Sheltech Aviation Limited (partnership with Envoy Group)

See also
 List of real estate companies of Bangladesh
 Platinum Suites

References

External links
 Official website of Sheltech (Pvt.) Ltd.
 Official website of Platinum Suites Ltd.

Real estate companies of Bangladesh
Square Group
Conglomerate companies of Bangladesh
1988 establishments in Bangladesh
Organisations based in Dhaka